Chester Willard Barrows (July 4, 1872 – February 19, 1931) was a justice of the Rhode Island Supreme Court from 1925 until his death in 1931.

Born in Woonsocket, Rhode Island, to William G. and Lydia S. (Willard) Barrows, he attended the public schools of Providence, and graduated from Brown University in 1895, and from Harvard Law School 1898. Gaining admission to the bar in Providence the same year, he entered the practice of law in that city. He served at times as a member of the State Board of Bar Examiners, an instructor in Law at Brown University, and a United States Referee in Bankruptcy.

On January 21, 1925, Barrows was appointed by the state legislature to a seat on the state supreme court vacated by the resignation of Justice Walter B. Vincent.

Barrows married Mary E. Crossley, with whom he had a daughter. He was an independent Republican.

References

Justices of the Rhode Island Supreme Court
1872 births
1931 deaths
Brown University alumni
People from Woonsocket, Rhode Island
Harvard Law School alumni